The 1997 Franklin Templeton Classic was a men's tennis tournament played on outdoor hard courts in Scottsdale, Arizona in the United States and was part of the World Series of the 1997 ATP Tour. It was the tenth edition of the tournament and was from March 3 through March 9, 1997. Unseeded Mark Philippoussis won the singles title.

Finals

Singles

 Mark Philippoussis defeated  Richey Reneberg 6–4, 7–6(7–4)
 It was Philippoussis' 1st singles title of the year and the 2nd of his career.

Doubles

 Luis Lobo /  Javier Sánchez defeated  Jonas Björkman /  Rick Leach 6–3, 6–3
 It was Lobo's 2nd title of the year and the 7th of his career. It was Sánchez's 2nd title of the year and the 26th of his career.

References

External links
 ITF tournament edition details

Franklin Templeton Classic
Tennis Channel Open
 
Franklin Templeton Classic
Franklin Templeton Classic
Franklin Templeton Classic